The Holyoke Hurricanes are a now defunct team of the Independent Women's Football League.  Based out of Holyoke, Massachusetts, the Hurricanes played their home games at Ware High School in nearby Ware.

The Hurricanes forfeited the final two games of the 2009 season, and all of the 2010 season.

Season-by-season 

|-
|2008 || 2 || 6 || 0 || 4th Tier II North Atlantic || 
|-
|2009 || 0 || 8 || 0 || 24th Tier II || --
|-
!Totals || 2 || 14 || 0
|colspan="2"|

Season schedules

2009

** = Forfeited

2010

External links 
 
 

Independent Women's Football League
Sports in Holyoke, Massachusetts
American football teams in Massachusetts
American football teams established in 2008
American football teams disestablished in 2010
2008 establishments in Massachusetts
2010 disestablishments in Massachusetts
Ware, Massachusetts
Women's sports in Massachusetts